The McGirr ministry (1947–1950) or Second McGirr ministry was the 53rd ministry of the New South Wales Government, and was led by the 28th Premier, Jim McGirr, of the Labor Party. The ministry was the second of three consecutive occasions when the Government was led by McGirr, as Premier.

McGirr was first elected to the New South Wales Legislative Assembly in 1922 and served continuously until 1952, holding the various seats of Cootamundra, Cumberland, Bankstown, and Liverpool. Having served in the third ministry of Jack Lang, and the first and second ministries of William McKell, McGirr was variously torn between Lang Labor and the newly formed Australian Labor Party. When McKell stood aside as Premier in 1947 in order to take up an appointment as Governor-General of Australia, McGirr was elected Labor Leader and became Premier. McGirr led Labor to victory at the 1947 state election.

This ministry covers the period from 19 May 1947 until the 1950 state election, held on 30 June, when McGirr led Labor to victory and the Third McGirr ministry was sworn in.

Composition of ministry

The composition of the ministry was announced by Premier McGirr on 19 May 1947. The principal changes from the first McGirr ministry were that Bill Dunn was dropped, replaced by Bill Sheahan and the portfolio of Building Materials was created, filled by Claude Matthews. There was a rearrangement of the Ministry in September 1949, triggered by the resignation of Deputy Premier, Jack Baddeley. Baddeley suffered a heart attack in December 1948 while serving as Acting Premier. Joe Cahill succeeded Baddeley as Deputy Premier. The portfolio of Co-operative Societies was created and filled by Clarrie Martin. 

 
Ministers are members of the Legislative Assembly unless otherwise noted.

See also

References

 

! colspan="3" style="border-top: 5px solid #cccccc" | New South Wales government ministries

New South Wales ministries
1947 establishments in Australia
1950 disestablishments in Australia
Australian Labor Party ministries in New South Wales